Madatyphlops is a genus of snakes in the family Typhlopidae.

Geographic range
The 15 species of the genus Madatyphlops are found mostly on Madagascar, but also occur on the Comoro Islands. A fossil species occurred on Mauritius.

Species
The following species are recognized as being valid.
Madatyphlops albanalis 
Madatyphlops andasibensis 
Madatyphlops arenarius 
Madatyphlops boettgeri 
Madatyphlops cariei  – extinct
Madatyphlops comorensis 
Madatyphlops decorsei 
Madatyphlops domerguei 
Madatyphlops eudelini 
Madatyphlops madagascariensis 
Madatyphlops microcephalus  
Madatyphlops mucronatus 
Madatyphlops ocularis 
Madatyphlops rajeryi 
Madatyphlops reuteri 

Nota bene: A binomial authority in parentheses indicates that the species was originally described in a genus other than Madatyphlops.

References

Further reading
Hedges, S. Blair; Marion, Angela B.; Lipp, Kelly M.; Marin, Julie; Vidal, Nicolas (2014). "A taxonomic framework for typhlopid snakes from the Caribbean and other regions (Reptilia, Squamata)". Caribbean Herpetology 49: 1-61. (Madatyphlops, new genus, p. 42).

 
Snake genera